Culama anthracica is a moth in the family Cossidae. It was described by Kallies and D.J. Hilton in 2012. It is found in Australia, where it has been recorded along the eastern coast and tablelands from Tasmania west and north to southern Victoria and southern Queensland. The habitat consists of wet and dry sclerophyll forests and montane woodlands.

The ground colour of the forewings is ash grey with two black transverse lines. The hindwings are dark grey. Adults are on wing from the end of October to early March.

Etymology
The species name refers to the anthracite black and grey coloration of the species and is derived from Greek anthrakis (meaning coal).

References

Natural History Museum Lepidoptera generic names catalog

Cossinae
Moths described in 2012
Endemic fauna of Australia
Moths of Australia